In number theory, two integers  and  are coprime, relatively prime or mutually prime if the only positive integer that is a divisor of both of them is 1. Consequently, any prime number that divides  does not divide , and vice versa. This is equivalent to their greatest common divisor (GCD) being 1.

The numbers 8 and 9 are coprime, despite the fact that neither considered individually is a prime number, since 1 is their only  common divisor. On the other hand, 6 and 9 are not coprime, because they are both divisible by 3. The numerator and denominator of a reduced fraction are coprime, by definition.

Notation and testing 

A fast way to determine whether two numbers are coprime is given by the Euclidean algorithm and its faster variants such as binary GCD algorithm or Lehmer's GCD algorithm.

A set of integers can also be called coprime if its elements share no common positive factor except 1. The set  is coprime, but it is not pairwise coprime since 2 and 4 are not relatively prime.

Properties 
The numbers 1 and −1 are the only integers coprime with every integer, and they are the only integers that are coprime with 0.

There exist integers  such that  (see Bézout's identity).
The integer  has a multiplicative inverse modulo , meaning that there exists an integer  such that . In ring-theoretic language,  is a unit in the ring  of integers modulo .

That is, we may "divide by " when working modulo .

This can be viewed as a generalization of Euclid's lemma.

(See figure 1.)

As a generalization of this, following easily from the Euclidean algorithm in base :

Coprimality in sets 

A set of integers  can also be called coprime or setwise coprime if the greatest common divisor of all the elements of the set is 1. For example, the integers 6, 10, 15 are coprime because 1 is the only positive integer that divides all of them.

If every pair in a set of integers is coprime, then the set is said to be pairwise coprime (or pairwise relatively prime, mutually coprime or mutually relatively prime). Pairwise coprimality is a stronger condition than setwise coprimality; every pairwise coprime finite set is also setwise coprime, but the reverse is not true. For example, the integers 4, 5, 6 are (setwise) coprime (because the only positive integer dividing all of them is 1), but they are not pairwise coprime (because ).

The concept of pairwise coprimality is important as a hypothesis in many results in number theory, such as the Chinese remainder theorem.

It is possible for an infinite set of integers to be pairwise coprime. Notable examples include the set of all prime numbers, the set of elements in Sylvester's sequence, and the set of all Fermat numbers.

Coprimality in ring ideals 

The Chinese remainder theorem can be generalized to any commutative ring, using coprime ideals.

Probability of coprimality 

 

There is no way to choose a positive integer at random so that each positive integer occurs with equal probability, but statements about "randomly chosen integers" such as the ones above can be formalized by using the notion of natural density. Although  will never equal  exactly, with work one can show that in the limit as  the probability  approaches .

More generally, the probability of  randomly chosen integers being coprime is

Generating all coprime pairs

The children of each vertex  are generated as follows:
Branch 1: 
Branch 2: 
Branch 3: 

This scheme is exhaustive and non-redundant with no invalid members.

Applications 

In machine design, an even, uniform gear wear is achieved by choosing the tooth counts of the two gears meshing together to be relatively prime. When a 1:1 gear ratio is desired, a gear relatively prime to the two equal-size gears may be inserted between them.

In pre-computer cryptography, some Vernam cipher machines combined several loops of key tape of different lengths. Many rotor machines combine rotors of different numbers of teeth. Such combinations work best when the entire set of lengths are pairwise coprime.

Generalizations 

See also

Euclid's orchard
Superpartient number

Notes

References

Further reading
.

Number theory